The 1972 Minnesota Twins finished 77–77, third in the American League West.

Offseason 
 October 22, 1971: Paul Powell was traded by the Twins to the Los Angeles Dodgers for Bobby Darwin.
 November 29, 1971: Brant Alyea was drafted from the Twins by the Oakland Athletics in the 1971 rule 5 draft.

Regular season 

On May 12, in a twenty-two inning match which concluded a day later, Danny Thompson went 0 for 10 with a sacrifice bunt, dropping his batting average 39 points over one game.  He and César Tovar set a team record with their eleven plate appearances.

After a slow start, manager Bill Rigney was replaced by Frank Quilici in early July.

On July 9, Rich Reese hit his third pinch-hit grand slam home run, tying a major league record in doing so.

Rothsay, Minnesota, native Dave Goltz made his major league debut on July 18 – he is the first Minnesotan drafted by the Minnesota Twins to make the big league club.  He gave up one hit in 3⅔ innings.  

Only one Twin made the All-Star Game: second baseman Rod Carew.

On July 31, pitcher Bert Blyleven gave up two inside-the-park home runs, both to the Chicago White Sox Dick Allen.  When this next occurs in the major leagues (October 4, 1986), Blyleven is again on the mound.  But the feat is accomplished this time by his Minnesota teammate Greg Gagne.

When César Tovar hit for the cycle on September 19, he finished with a game-ending home run.  The only other player to do that in history was Ken Boyer. In later years, and after such a hit became known as a "walk-off home run", the feat was duplicated by George Brett, Dwight Evans, and Carlos González. Tovar is just the second Twin to hit for the cycle, after Rod Carew in 1970; eight more Twins will do so by 2009.

Carew won his second AL batting title with a .318 average, but did not hit any home runs during the season. Previously, Zach Wheat was the last player to accomplish this feat when he won the 1918 NL batting title with the Brooklyn Dodgers. Bobby Darwin showed potential as a hitter with 22 HR and 80 RBI, but that did not make up for age and injuries taking their toll on other players. (Those numbers were also suppressed by his Twins-record 145 strikeouts.) Harmon Killebrew hit 26 HR (4th in the league) but drove in only 75 runs. Tony Oliva's bad knees limited him to only 10 games. César Tovar led the team with 86 runs scored. Four pitchers had double digit wins: Bert Blyleven (17–17), Dick Woodson (14–14), Jim Perry (13–16), and Jim Kaat (10–2). Kaat also won his 11th Gold Glove Award.

797,901 fans attended Twins games, the seventh highest total in the American League.  It was almost half the number of fans that had attended just a few seasons earlier.

Season standings

Record vs. opponents

Notable transactions 
 May 12, 1972: Sal Butera was signed by the Twins as an amateur free agent.
 June 6, 1972: 1972 Major League Baseball draft
Willie Norwood was drafted by the Twins in the 3rd round.
Lyman Bostock was drafted by the Twins in the 26th round.

Roster

Player stats

Batting

Starters by position 
Note: Pos = Position; G = Games played; AB = At bats; H = Hits; Avg. = Batting average; HR = Home runs; RBI = Runs batted in

Other batters 
Note: G = Games played; AB = At bats; H = Hits; Avg. = Batting average; HR = Home runs; RBI = Runs batted in

Pitching

Starting pitchers 
Note: G = Games pitched; IP = Innings pitched; W = Wins; L = Losses; ERA = Earned run average; SO = Strikeouts

Other pitchers 
Note: G = Games pitched; IP = Innings pitched; W = Wins; L = Losses; ERA = Earned run average; SO = Strikeouts

Relief pitchers 
Note: G = Games pitched; W = Wins; L = Losses; SV = Saves; ERA = Earned run average; SO = Strikeouts

Farm system

Notes

References 

Player stats from www.baseball-reference.com
Team info from www.baseball-almanac.com

Minnesota Twins seasons
Minnesota Twins season
Minnesota Twins